Darci Lima Sarmanho Vargas (12 December 1895 – 25 June 1968) was the wife of Getúlio Vargas, former President of Brazil, and the First Lady of the country during two different periods (from 1930 to 1945 and from 1951 until her husband's suicide).

Darci and Getúlio Vargas, whom she married in March 1911, had five children. However, the president was an unfaithful husband. Aimée de Heeren, later the daughter-in-law of Fernanda Wanamaker, was reported to be one of his mistresses.  

She became a notable philanthropist and founded many charitable organizations.

See also
 List of first ladies of Brazil

External link

1895 births
1968 deaths
First ladies of Brazil
Brazilian people of Portuguese descent
People from Rio Grande do Sul
Darci Vargas